The Korean salamander (Hynobius leechii), or Gensan salamander, is the most common species of salamander on the Korean peninsula, and is also found and on Jeju Island and in the north-eastern Chinese provinces of Liaoning, Jilin and Heilongjiang. It typically lives on forested hills, and from time to time mass deaths occur in Korea when salamanders encounter man-made drainage structures. This has prompted Korean government officials to execute a series of mass evacuations in heavily salamandered areas.

Subspecies
Hynobius leechi quelpartensis

See also
List of amphibians of Korea
Korean crevice salamander
Kori salamander
Jiyul - Buddhist nun who fasted to stop destruction of Korean salamander lands 
Some Reptiles and Amphibians from Korea by (1962) Robert G. Webb, J. Knox Jones, Jr., and George W. Byers in University of Kansas Publications Museum of Natural History, Vol. 15, No. 2, pp. 149–173, January 31, 1962.

References

External links
Caudata Culture entry

Hynobius
Amphibians described in 1928
Amphibians of China
Amphibians of Korea